Sankalpa is a film-architecture installation by the artists Shekhar Kapur and David Adjaye shown at Swarovski Crystal Worlds in Austria.

The title Sankalpa is taken from Indian yoga-thought where the Sanskrit word sankalpa (Hindu thought) means "resolution", "free will" and "imagination". The installation is an interpretation of the short film Passage by Shekhar Kapur, which is projected through Adjayes's faceted architecture.

External links 
 Sankalpa at Swarovski Crystal Worlds, Austria
 Passage Filmproject
 Shekar Kapurs Official Website
 Website of Adjaye Associates

Installation art